Solothurn railway station serves the municipality of Solothurn, the capital city of the Canton of Solothurn, Switzerland. Solothurn is a major railway junction and is served by six railway lines.

Layout
Solothurn serves four operators from three different areas. The main part of the station has one side and two island platforms, serving tracks 1–3 and 5–6. These are used by BLS and Swiss Federal Railways trains. On the south side of the station, another island platform serves tracks 9–10, used by Regionalverkehr Bern-Solothurn (RBS). Finally, the narrow-gauge trains of Aare Seeland mobil (asm) stop on Luzernstrasse, on the north side of the station. This is designated track 21.

Services
 the following services stop at Solothurn:

 InterCity:
 Regio:

See also

SBB-CFF-FFS

References

External links
 
 
 Interactive station plan (Solothurn)

Railway stations in the canton of Solothurn
Swiss Federal Railways stations
Solothurn
Railway stations in Switzerland opened in 1876